The  is a DC tilting electric multiple unit (EMU) train operated by the East Japan Railway Company (JR East) in Japan on limited express services on the Chuo Main Line since December 2017.

A pre-series train, consisting of one nine-car set (set S101) and one three-car set (set S201), was delivered in July 2015 for performance testing. Originally intended to enter revenue service in spring 2016, the first trains entered service on 23 December 2017.

Design
The exterior styling was overseen by the industrial design firm Ken Okuyama Design. Like the E351 series trains which they are scheduled to replace, the new E353 series trains incorporate tilting technology to allow faster speeds around curves. The trains use a pneumatic tilt system (instead of the pendulum system used in the older trains) and an active suspension to reduce tilt times and help reduce motion sickness in passengers. The train features a database of curves along the line, allowing the train to begin tilting before reaching the curve. The pre-series train also had dampers installed between the cars to reduce vibrations, but this feature was discontinued on the subsequent production trainsets.

Bogies
The trains use bolsterless bogies developed from those used on earlier E259 series and E657 series trains. Motored bogies with capability for retrofitting anti-oscillation equipment (rear bogies on car 1 and 3) are designated DT81, motored bogies equipped anti-roll devices (cars 2, 5, 7, and 10) are designated DT82, and motor bogies not equipped with either (cars 6 and 11) are designated DT81A. Non-powered (trailer) bogies are designated TR265, and are equipped with a parking brake and capability for retrofitting anti-oscillation equipment, but those not equipped with a parking brake (rear bogies on cars 4 and 14, and both bogies on car 9) are designated TR265A, and those on car 8, which not equipped with either are designated TR265B.

Formations
Trains consist of a nine-car main set (with five cars motored), numbered S101 onward, and a three-car add-on set, numbered S201 onward, with car 1 at the southern (Shinjuku) end as follows.

Cars 2 and 5 each have two single-arm pantographs (only one is normally used), and cars 7 and 10 each have one. Cars 1 and 3 each have only one motored bogie (at the inner ends).

Interior
The wine red seat covers are intended to create subdued atmosphere. The pale blue seat covers are intended to evoke images of the Azusa River, after which the train service was named. AC power outlets are provided at each seat. The trains include universal access toilets and security cameras. LED lighting is used on these trains, for the first time on JR East limited express rolling stock.

While not initially included in the pre-series train, luggage racks are installed in cars 1, 3, 5, 7, 9, 10, and 12.

Inside, the floors feature rubber coverings to reduce the noise of footsteps. Individual seat numbers are written in braille and each seat has an individual air diffuser for passenger comfort. The cars also feature air purifiers using ozone to reduce unpleasant odors.

Toilets
Cars 1, 2, 4, 6, 8, 9, and 11 have toilet facilities as follows.

History
Details of the new trains on order were first officially announced by JR East in February 2014.

The first trainset, consisting of one nine-car and one three-car set, was delivered from the Japan Transport Engineering Company (J-TREC) factory in Yokohama to Matsumoto Depot in July 2015. Mainline test running started on 29 July 2015. The pre-series train was formally shown off to the media on 2 August 2015.

, the train was still undergoing test running.

In October 2017, JR East announced that the first trains would enter revenue service on Super Azusa services from 23 December 2017, by which date three pairs of (9+3-car) trainsets would be available.

The trains were awarded the 2018 Laurel Prize by the Japan Railfan Club. 

From the start of the revised timetable on 17 March 2018, all Super Azusa services will be operated by E353 series trains, and over the following two years, the E257 series trainsets used on Azusa and Kaiji services are also scheduled to be replaced by E353 series trains.

Build details

The manufacturer and delivery dates for the fleet are as shown below.

References

External links

 JR East press release announcing new trains 
 E353 series design details on Ken Okuyama Design website 

East Japan Railway Company
Electric multiple units of Japan
Tilting trains
Train-related introductions in 2016
1500 V DC multiple units of Japan
J-TREC multiple units